Meskin (also Romanized as Meskīn) is a village in Margan Rural District, in the Central District of Hirmand County, Sistan and Baluchestan Province, Iran. At the 2006 census, its population was 292, in 58 families.

References 

Populated places in Hirmand County